The Larry Stewart Leadership and Inspiration Award is awarded by the Entertainment Industries Council at the PRISM Awards to an entertainment industry professional for leading and inspiring the industry to make a difference on drug, alcohol, tobacco, and/or mental health issues. The award is named in the memory of veteran writer/producer/director Larry Stewart. 

American awards